Gareth Dale Hoskins OBE (15 April 1967 – 9 January 2016) was a Scottish architect.

Biography
Born in Edinburgh on 15 April 1967, Hoskins attended George Watson’s College and the Mackintosh School of Architecture at the Glasgow School of Art. He joined Penoyre & Prasad in 1992 before starting his own firm in 1998. In 2000, Building Design gave Hoskins its Young Architect of the Year Award. In 2005 he was appointed to the Board of Architecture + Design Scotland where he served as Scottish Healthcare Design Champion for 4 years from 2006. He was named UK Architect of the Year in 2006 and Scottish Architect of the Year three years later. In 2010, he was made an Officer of the Order of the British Empire for services to architecture.

Personal
Hoskins was married, had two children and lived in Helensburgh. He had a heart attack on 3 January 2016 while taking part in a fencing competition, and died six days later at the Edinburgh Royal Infirmary. Shortly after his death Argyll and Bute Council announced that the renovation of Hermitage Park in Helensburgh will be dedicated to his memory as he was the project architect.

Projects
National Museum of Scotland redesign 
Scottish National Gallery Scottish Collection Gallery Redevelopment
Victoria & Albert Museum entrance and the Architecture Gallery and Exhibition spaces 
Old Royal High School hotel (rejected)
World Museum, Vienna
Aberdeen Art Gallery redesign
National Theatre of Scotland
St Peter's Seminary, Cardross (with Urban Splash)
Mareel
Edinburgh Castle ticket office
Mackintosh Interpretation Centre at The Lighthouse, Glasgow

References

External links

1967 births
2016 deaths
20th-century Scottish architects
21st-century Scottish architects
Officers of the Order of the British Empire
Alumni of the Glasgow School of Art
Architects from Edinburgh
People educated at George Watson's College